Pipariya is a census town in Jabalpur district in the Indian state of Madhya Pradesh.

Demographics
 India census, Pipariya had a population of 4483. Males constitute 52% of the population and females 48%. Pipariya has an average literacy rate of 68%, higher than the national average of 59.5%: male literacy is 77%, and female literacy is 59%. In Pipariya, 13% of the population is under 6 years of age.

References

Cities and towns in Jabalpur district